Rusty Pierce (born July 24, 1979 in The Woodlands, Texas) is a former American soccer player who spent eight seasons in Major League Soccer.

Career

College
Pierce played college soccer at the University of North Carolina at Greensboro from 1997 to 1999, appearing in 51 games during his time there. Following his junior season, Pierce signed a Project-40 contract with Major League Soccer, entering the 2000 MLS SuperDraft, where he was selected 14th overall by the New England Revolution.

Professional
As a rookie, Pierce quickly earned a place in the Revolution starting lineup with his tenacious defending, and finished the season second on the team in minutes played, having started in 29 of the team's 32 games. Pierce remained a constant in the New England backline for the next four years when healthy, although injuries limited his playing time in the 2002 and 2004 seasons.

Following the 2004 season, Pierce's impending free agency led the Revolution to leave him unprotected for the 2004 MLS Expansion Draft, where he was selected in the eighth round by Real Salt Lake. After the 2005 season, his rights were traded to the Columbus Crew, where he played 2 years

Following a year out of soccer, during which Pierce founded a financial investment company and worked as a real estate broker in Myrtle Beach, South Carolina, Pierce returned to the game in 2009 to play for the Wilmington Hammerheads in the USL Second Division.

International
Pierce has played for United States national team at a number of youth levels, but is uncapped at the senior level.

References

External links
 Wilmington Hammerheads bio
 Columbus Crew bio

1979 births
Living people
American soccer players
New England Revolution players
Real Salt Lake players
Columbus Crew players
Wilmington Hammerheads FC players
Major League Soccer players
USL Second Division players
UNC Greensboro Spartans men's soccer players
United States men's youth international soccer players
United States men's under-20 international soccer players
New England Revolution draft picks
Soccer players from Texas
Association football defenders